Heinrich Adam (1787 – 15 February 1862) was a German painter.

Life
Heinrich Adam, a brother of Albrecht Adam, was born in Nördlingen in 1787. He studied painting in Augsburg and Munich, and distinguished himself as a painter of landscapes and as an engraver. In 1811 he stayed with Albrecht at Lake Como, and painted in watercolours. He also engraved six hunting-pieces, after his brother Albrecht, at Milan, in 1813.

Subsequently he painted landscapes and views of towns, which are executed with great accuracy. His Das neue München mit den Bauten König Ludwigs I. (1839), a view in oils of the Max-Josephs-Platz, surrounded by 14 smaller pictures of new buildings in Munich, mounted together in one frame, is in the collection of the Munich Stadtmuseum. A set of watercolours in a similar format  is in the Metropolitan Museum in New York.

He died in Munich in 1862.

See also
 List of German painters

References

Attribution:

External links 

1787 births
1862 deaths
People from Nördlingen
19th-century German painters
19th-century German male artists
German male painters